Burkina Faso is scheduled to compete at the 2024 Summer Olympics in Paris from 26 July to 11 August 2024. Although the nation made its official debut in Munich 1972 under the name Upper Volta, Burkinabé athletes have appeared in every edition of the Summer Olympics from 1988 onwards.

Competitors
The following is the list of number of competitors in the Games.

Cycling

Road
Burkina Faso entered one rider to compete in the women's road race by finishing in the top two at the 2023 African Championships in Accra, Ghana.

References

External links

Nations at the 2024 Summer Olympics
2024
2024 in Burkinabé sport